The Khazar Lankaran 2013-14 season is Khazar Lankaran's ninth Azerbaijan Premier League season. It is their first full season with John Toshack as manager. They started the season by competing in the 2013–14 UEFA Europa League, reaching the 2nd qualifying round, after defeating Sliema Wanderers, before losing 0-10 on aggregate to Maccabi Haifa. As runners up in the previous season Azerbaijan Cup, Khazar took part in the revamped Azerbaijan Supercup, emerging victorious against Neftchi Baku. They currently taking part in the 2013–14 Azerbaijan Cup and 2013–14 Azerbaijan Premier League.

After a poor start to the season, in which Khazar only picked up 14 points from 14 games, Toshack resigned from his post following their 3-0 defeat to Baku on 22 November 2013. Giovanni Melkiorrenin was placed in temporary charge with Mustafa Denizli taking over on 3 December 2013, on a 1.5 year contract. On 16 May 2014, Denizli had his contract with Khazar mutually terminated.

Squad

Out on loan

Reserve

Transfers

Summer

In:

 

Out:

Winter

In:

 
 
 

 
 

Out:

Competitions

Friendlies

Azerbaijan Supercup

Azerbaijan Premier League

Results summary

Results by round

Results

League table

Azerbaijan Cup

UEFA Europa League

Qualifying phase

Squad statistics

Appearances and goals

|-
|colspan="14"|Players away from the club on loan:

|-
|colspan="14"|Players who appeared for Khazar Lankaran no longer at the club:

|}

Goal scorers

Disciplinary record

Other information
Qarabağ have played their home games at the Tofiq Bahramov Stadium since 1993 due to the ongoing situation in Quzanlı. Qarabağ vs Khazar Lankaran was played at the Bakcell Arena due to the Tofiq Bahramov Stadium1 pitch being relaid.

References

External links
Khazar Lankaran at Soccerway.com

Khazar
Khazar Lankaran FK seasons